Tomás Pina Isla (born 14 October 1987) is a Spanish professional footballer who currently plays as a central midfielder for Chinese Super League club Henan Songshan Longmen.

He amassed La Liga totals of 301 matches and eight goals over 12 seasons, with Mallorca, Villarreal and Alavés. He also played in Belgium and China.

Club career

Mallorca
Pina was born in Villarta de San Juan, Ciudad Real, Castile-La Mancha. After finishing his football development with amateurs CD Móstoles, he moved to RCD Mallorca in the summer of 2008.

Pina made his professional – and La Liga – debut with the latter on 31 January 2010, playing the last ten minutes in a 2–1 away loss against Xerez CD after coming on as a substitute for Bruno China. He spent the vast majority of his first professional season with the reserve team, in the Segunda División B.

Villarreal
On 5 July 2013, after Mallorca's top-flight relegation, Pina signed a five-year deal with Villarreal CF, in turn promoted. He scored his first goal for his new team on 4 October, starting and netting the last in a 3–0 home win over Granada CF.

Pina was heavily played during his three-year spell at the Estadio El Madrigal by manager Marcelino García Toral, whether as a starter or a replacement. In the 2015–16 campaign he appeared in 36 games in all competitions, his only goal helping oust S.S.C. Napoli from the UEFA Europa League as his 59th-minute long-range lob from the left flank earned a 1–1 away draw and a 2–1 aggregate victory in the round of 32.

Brugge and Alavés
On 4 July 2016, the 28-year-old Pina moved abroad for the first time in his career, joining Club Brugge KV from Belgium until 2020. On 7 August of the following year, he returned to Spain and its top tier after agreeing to a one-year loan deal with Deportivo Alavés with a buyout clause.

On 12 August 2018, Pina signed a permanent three-year contract with the Glorioso.

Henan Songshan Longmen
Pina joined Henan Songshan Longmen F.C. of the Chinese Super League on 28 July 2022.

Career statistics

Club

References

External links

1987 births
Living people
People from Ciudad Real
Sportspeople from the Province of Ciudad Real
Spanish footballers
Footballers from Castilla–La Mancha
Association football midfielders
La Liga players
Segunda División B players
Tercera División players
CD Móstoles footballers
RCD Mallorca B players
RCD Mallorca players
Villarreal CF players
Deportivo Alavés players
Belgian Pro League players
Club Brugge KV players
Chinese Super League players
Henan Songshan Longmen F.C. players
Spanish expatriate footballers
Expatriate footballers in Belgium
Expatriate footballers in China
Spanish expatriate sportspeople in Belgium
Spanish expatriate sportspeople in China